Vedkosten Peak is a 2,285 m tall bare peak standing 1 nautical mile (1.9 km) southeast of Hoggestabben Butte in the Muhlig-Hofmann Mountains of Queen Maud Land. It was mapped by Norwegian cartographers from surveys and air photos by the Norwegian Antarctic Expedition (1956–60) and named Vedkosten (the wooden broom).

Mountains of Queen Maud Land
Princess Martha Coast